Deltacephalus is an extinct genus of prehistoric stereospondyl temnospondyl from Madagascar.

See also

 Prehistoric amphibian
 List of prehistoric amphibians

References

Stereospondyls
Prehistoric amphibian genera
Triassic temnospondyls of Africa
Fossil taxa described in 1915
Taxa named by William Elgin Swinton